The 1989 NBA playoffs was the postseason tournament of the National Basketball Association's 1988–89 season. The tournament concluded with the Eastern Conference champion Detroit Pistons defeating the Western Conference champion Los Angeles Lakers 4 games to 0 in the NBA Finals. Joe Dumars was named NBA Finals MVP. The Pistons had one of the most dominant playoff runs in NBA history, finishing 15–2 with their only losses to the Chicago Bulls in the Eastern Conference Finals. This NBA playoffs also holds the record for the most sweeps in an entire NBA playoffs with 9 out of 15 series being decided in just 3 or 4 games.

The Lakers won the Western Conference title without losing a game, and entered the NBA Finals as the heavy favorites. However, they were swept in the Finals by the Pistons, due in part to season-ending injuries suffered by Magic Johnson and Byron Scott. The Lakers became the first team in NBA history to open an NBA post-season with 11 straight victories and to sweep three series in an NBA post-season.

Chicago advanced to the Eastern Conference Finals for the first time since 1975 (back when they were a member of the Western Conference) (and the first time in Michael Jordan's career), but their season was ended by Detroit for the second straight year. Two rounds earlier, Jordan hit "The Shot" over Craig Ehlo at the buzzer to beat the Cavs.

The Boston Celtics' first-round playoff sweep by the Pistons was the first time they failed to get past the round of 16. Boston's chances were hampered by the absence of Larry Bird during these playoffs due to a season-ending injury earlier in the season; the first and only time in Bird's NBA career he'd miss playing in the playoffs.

Former Utah Jazz head coach Jerry Sloan made the first of 19 playoff appearances in a 22-year tenure. The only time he missed the playoffs with Utah was 2004–2006. Prior to this, he had last appeared in the playoffs in 1981 with the Bulls. His Jazz were ousted by the Golden State Warriors 3–0, the second time a seventh seed had beaten the second seed in the playoffs. Under Don Nelson, the Warriors became famous for their up-tempo game that made up for an undersized lineup, as well as their ability to create mismatches. The Warriors made history as the only team to beat either of the top two seeds three times in the NBA Playoffs; they beat the second-seed San Antonio Spurs in 1991 and top-seeded Dallas Mavericks (a team Nelson also coached) in 2007.

Bracket

First round

Eastern Conference first round

(1) Detroit Pistons vs. (8) Boston Celtics

This was the fifth playoff meeting between these two teams, with the Celtics winning three of the first four meetings.

(2) New York Knicks vs. (7) Philadelphia 76ers

 Gerald Wilkins hits the series-winning shot with 6 seconds left.

This was the ninth playoff meeting between these two teams, with the 76ers winning six of the first eight meetings.

(3) Cleveland Cavaliers vs. (6) Chicago Bulls

 Brad Daugherty hits the game-tying free throws with 4 second left in regulation to force OT.

 Michael Jordan hits the series-winning shot at the buzzer.

This was the second playoff meeting between these two teams, with the Bulls winning the first meeting.

(4) Atlanta Hawks vs. (5) Milwaukee Bucks

This was the third playoff meeting between these two teams, with each team winning one series apiece.

Western Conference first round

(1) Los Angeles Lakers vs. (8) Portland Trail Blazers

This was the fourth playoff meeting between these two teams, with the Lakers winning two of the first three meetings.

(2) Utah Jazz vs. (7) Golden State Warriors

 In the 16-team playoff format, this is the only time a top 2 seed has been swept in the First Round in NBA history. However, a top 2 seed has yet to be swept in the First Round in a best-of-seven series format.

This was the second playoff meeting between these two teams, with the Warriors winning the first meeting.

(3) Phoenix Suns vs. (6) Denver Nuggets

This was the third playoff meeting between these two teams, with each team winning one series apiece.

(4) Seattle SuperSonics vs. (5) Houston Rockets

 Derrick McKey hits the series-winning alley-oop layup at the buzzer.

This was the third playoff meeting between these two teams, with the SuperSonics winning the first two meetings.

Conference semifinals

Eastern Conference semifinals

(1) Detroit Pistons vs. (5) Milwaukee Bucks

This was the second playoff meeting between these two teams, with the Pistons winning the first meeting.

(2) New York Knicks vs. (6) Chicago Bulls

 Michael Jordan hits the series-winning free throws with 4 seconds left.

This was the second playoff meeting between these two teams, with the Bulls winning the first meeting.

Western Conference semifinals

(1) Los Angeles Lakers vs. (4) Seattle SuperSonics

 The Lakers posted the greatest comeback in NBA playoff history by overcoming a 29-point deficit (43–14), which has since been surpassed.

This was the fifth playoff meeting between these two teams, with each team winning two series apiece.

(3) Phoenix Suns vs. (7) Golden State Warriors

This was the second playoff meeting between these two teams, with the Suns winning the first meeting.

Conference finals

Eastern Conference finals

(1) Detroit Pistons vs. (6) Chicago Bulls

 Michael Jordan hits the game-winner with 3 seconds left.

This was the third playoff meeting between these two teams, with each team winning one series apiece.

Western Conference finals

(1) Los Angeles Lakers vs. (3) Phoenix Suns

This was the sixth playoff meeting between these two teams, with the Lakers winning the first five meetings.

NBA Finals: (E1) Detroit Pistons vs. (W1) Los Angeles Lakers

 Joe Dumars blocks David Rivers' potential game-tying 3 with 8 seconds left.

 Kareem Abdul-Jabbar's final NBA game.

This was the 11th playoff meeting between these two teams, with the Lakers winning nine of the first ten meetings.

References

External links
 Basketball-Reference.com's 1989 NBA Playoffs page
 

National Basketball Association playoffs
Playoffs
Sports in Portland, Oregon
GMA Network television specials

fi:NBA-kausi 1988–1989#Pudotuspelit